Traer is an unincorporated community in Decatur County, Kansas, United States.

History
A post office was opened in Traer in 1883, and remained in operation until 1971. The town was originally 1 mile west of its present location and was named Connersville, where a post office was established in 1875. When the town was moved in 1883, it was renamed Traer after the city of Traer, Iowa.

Education
The community is served by Oberlin USD 294 public school district.

References

Further reading

External links
 Decatur County maps: Current, Historic, KDOT

Unincorporated communities in Decatur County, Kansas
Unincorporated communities in Kansas